Agneta de Graeff van Polsbroek (Amsterdam, 10 November 1603 – 3 or 4 March 1656), was a patrician woman from the Dutch Golden Age. She became known as the mother-in-law of Johan de Witt.

Biography 
Agneta was born as the oldest daughter of Jacob Dircksz de Graeff and Aeltje Boelens Loen (?–1620). In 1625 she was married to Jan Bicker. The couple had four daughters:
 Elisabeth Bicker married Jacobus Trip, a wealthy arms dealer
 Geertruida Bicker married Jean Deutz, a very rich Banker of Amsterdam
 Wendela Bicker married Johan de Witt
 Jacoba Bicker married her full cousin Pieter de Graeff

The couple lived at their country houses De Eult at Baarn, Akerendam and Duynwijck in Beverwijk. Between the city of Amsterdam they owned a cityhause at Herengracht and an island, called Bickerseiland. In 1663/64 Agneta was painted by Wallerant Vaillant. Her tomb chapel is located at the Westerkerk.

References

Literature 
 Graeff, P. de (P. de Graeff Gerritsz en Dirk de Graeff van Polsbroek) Genealogie van de familie De Graeff van Polsbroek, Amsterdam 1882.
 Bruijn, J. H. de Genealogie van het geslacht De Graeff van Polsbroek 1529/1827, met bijlagen. De Built 1962-63.
 Fölting, H.P., 'De landsadvocaten en raadpensionarissen der Staten van Holland en West-Friesland 1480–1795. Een genealogische benadering. Deel III' in: Jaarboek Centraal Bureau Voor Genealogie. Deel 29 (1975 Den Haag; Centraal Bureau Voor Genealogie) p. 210-269, (213)

Agneta, de Graeff van Polsbroek
17th-century Dutch women
Nobility from Amsterdam
1603 births
1656 deaths